James David "Jay" Moloney (November 14, 1964 – November 16, 1999) was an American Hollywood talent agent. Moloney was a top Creative Artists Agency (CAA) agent and a protégé of CAA founder Michael Ovitz. He committed suicide at age 35.

Early life and education
Moloney grew up in Southern California, but moved to Newport, Oregon with his mother at age 14. His father, Jim Moloney, was a Hollywood screenwriter who died in 1994. He was of Irish and Jewish descent.

Career 
Moloney joined Creative Artists Agency (CAA) as an intern in June 1983 while attending USC. He later dropped out of college at the age of 20. He quickly became a protege of Michael Ovitz, the founder of CAA. By the age of 21, Moloney was part of CAA's "Young Turks", along with David O'Connor, Kevin Huvane, Richard Lovett and Bryan Lourd, who as a group would go on to lead CAA after Ovitz's departure. At the peak of his career, he handled Hollywood stars including Steven Spielberg, Martin Scorsese, David Letterman, Uma Thurman, and Leonardo DiCaprio.

After Ovitz left CAA for Disney, Moloney was named managing director. Due to an addiction to cocaine that started in 1995, Moloney was unable to perform on the job, and was later forced out of CAA. His career fall was documented in the media. In 1999, he joined Paradise Music & Entertainment, but his contract was terminated due to his frequent absences.

Personal life 
He became addicted to painkillers following open-heart surgery to correct a congenital defect.

Moloney was a rising star inside CAA even at a young age, and became the protege of Michael Ovitz, the founder of CAA. He felt abandoned when Ovitz left CAA for Disney. His drug and alcohol problem got worse during this time, which was shortly after the death of his alcoholic father, from whom he had been estranged.

Moloney dated several actresses including Jennifer Grey, Sherilyn Fenn, and Gina Gershon. Moloney was described by many as handsome, charming, and affable.

Death and legacy 
He committed suicide by hanging himself two days after he turned 35 on November 16, 1999.

Danny Huston played a character inspired by Moloney in Bernard Rose's film Ivans Xtc.

References 

1964 births
1999 suicides
American talent agents
American entertainment industry businesspeople
Suicides by hanging in California
People from Malibu, California
People from Newport, Oregon
University of Southern California alumni
American people of Irish descent
American people of Jewish descent
1999 deaths